The blue rainbowfish (Melanotaenia caerulea) is a species of rainbowfish in the subfamily Melanotaeniinae which is endemic to Papua New Guinea. It is found mostly in the lower and middle Kikori drainage system.

The blue rainbowfish was described by Gerald R. Allen in 1996.

References

Melanotaenia
Freshwater fish of Papua New Guinea
Fish described in 1996